Wellington Free Ambulance (WFA), also known simply as Wellington Free, is a charitable organisation providing free to the patient ambulance services in the Greater Wellington Region of New Zealand.

History

The Wellington Free Ambulance service was inaugurated on 9 November 1927 by the mayor of Wellington, Sir Charles Norwood. The catalyst for establishing a free ambulance service for the Wellington community came from the frustration of seeing an injured man lying on the road, and no hospital ambulance being available.

The service began operating from the Old Navals boatshed, which later became the Wellington Rowing Club clubhouse. The original station building soon proved to be less than desirable and in 1932, Lord Bledisloe laid the foundation stone on a purpose built station in Cable Street.

Wellington Free expanded, and in 1956 the first station to be built out of Wellington City was established in Lower Hutt, followed by stations in Upper Hutt (1961), and Porirua (1963). The Kapiti Coast got its ambulance station in 1977, the same year a station was established in Newtown.

By the early 1990s, Wellington Free had outgrown its Cable St building. After a major fundraising effort, in 1994 then-Prince Charles opened a replacement station in Davis Street, Thorndon, which still operates as the service's headquarters today.

Bases were established in Waikanae and Wainuiomata in 1999, a replacement Porirua Station building opened in October 2000, followed by the Linkspan Response Post on the Wellington Waterfront in November 2008, and the Johnsonville Station in May 2010.

In March 2011, after a concerted fundraising and significant contribution by the Wellington Free Ambulance Trust, the Newtown Regional Ambulance Station was opened in the new Wellington Hospital grounds. In March 2012, after winning a Government tender to outsource the last DHB run ambulance service in the Wairarapa, Wellington Free Ambulance became the ambulance service in for the region.

Operations

The service annually assists nearly 74,000 patients in the Greater Wellington Region. The headquarters includes vehicle maintenance facilities, and a communications centre - one of three in the national network.

Funding
The cost of running the service in 2013 was $21M. 80% of this cost is met by the Ministry of Health and the Accident Compensation Corporation. The remainder comes from donations and bequests from the public, proceeds from first aid training and supplies, and medical alarms.

Resources
 the service has the following resources:
 10 ambulance stations
 25 ambulances
 3 emergency fast response vehicles
 2 4WD rescue vehicles
17 patient transport vehicles
 6 events ambulances
 2 Urgent Community Care vehicles
 1 major incident response truck
 2 major incident response trailers

References

External links
Official website
Youtube WFA responding to a call

1927 in New Zealand
1927 establishments in New Zealand
Ambulance services in New Zealand
Organisations based in Wellington
Emergency services in New Zealand